The Aboriginal Shire of Mapoon is a local government area in Far North Queensland, Australia. It is on the western coast of Cape York Peninsula on the Gulf of Carpentaria.

Geography 
Most local government areas are a single contiguous area (possibly including islands). However, Aboriginal Shires are often defined as a number of disjoint areas each containing an Indigenous community. In the case of the Aboriginal Shire of Mapoon, there are three areas all within the locality of Mapoon (which is otherwise within the Shire of Cook), two to the north and south of the Wenlock River's mouth at the Gulf of Carpentaria and a third further up river.

Mayors 

 2020–present: Aileen Muriel Addo

References

 
Mapoon